This Side of Resurrection is a Portuguese independent drama film written and directed by Joaquim Sapinho. It was produced by the independent production company Rosa Filmes and had its world premiere at the 2011 edition of the Toronto International Film Festival as part of the Visions programme.

Release and reception
The film had its world premiere in the official selection of the 2011 edition of the Toronto International Film Festival, as part of the Visions programme. It was also presented as the official selection of the 2011 edition of the São Paulo International Film Festival. An American premiere took place at the Harvard Film Archive, followed by the Anthology Film Archives, as part of The School of Reis program.

Plot
The film tells the story of a sister and a brother, Inês and Rafael. Since the divorce of their parents, their family hasn't seen Rafael. Inês runs away from home looking for Rafael, only to find out that he is at Guincho Beach, surfing. Rafael is a former surf champion who tests the limits of his life every day by seeking out the most dangerous waves. When the two siblings meet, Guincho makes them come together in a promise of paradise on earth, as it is the last place where their family lived happily together. But Inês is surprised one day when she finds her brother looking fixedly to the Serra de Sintra mountain range, where the Convent of the Capuchos was once his refuge. She fears that she has brought him back memories of their parents' separation. Rafael is in a crisis of faith. When one day he disappears, Inês knows he has gone back to the convent, and she starts doing what she can to bring him back to her.

Cast and characters
 Pedro Sousa as Rafael
 Joana Barata as Inês
 Sofia Grilo as 'the mother
 Pedro Carmo as 'brother Simão
 Luís Castro as brother Lucas
 João Cardoso as João
 Mariana Pacheco as Mariana

References

External links
 
 This Side of Resurrection at the Toronto International Film Festival web site
 This Side of Resurrection at the Harvard Film Archive
 This Side of Resurrection at the São Paulo International Film Festival web site
 Rosa Filmes' This Side of Resurrection official web page at the Rosa Filmes web site
 This Side of Resurrection at MUBI

2011 films
Portuguese drama films
2010s Portuguese-language films
Films directed by Joaquim Sapinho
Films set in Portugal
Films about Christianity